St Michael le Belfrey is an Anglican church in York, England. It is situated at the junction of High Petergate and Minster Yard, directly opposite York Minster, in the centre of the city.

History

The present church building was built between 1525 and 1537 and replaced a church that dated back to at least 1294. The church is famous for being the place where Guy Fawkes was baptised on 16 April 1570. Fawkes later became a Roman Catholic, which led to the failed 1605 Gunpowder Plot. The church was also the scene of the wedding of Christopher Levett of York, the English explorer, to Mercy More, daughter of the Revd Robert More of Guiseley, Yorkshire, in 1608. It is also sited near to the place where the Emperor Constantine was proclaimed a Roman Emperor.

The west front and bellcote date from 1867 and were supervised by the architect George Fowler Jones. The stained glass panels on the front of the building were restored by John Knowles in the early 19th century.

Recent history
In the early 1970s the parish of St Michael le Belfrey was joined with the nearby St Cuthbert's Church, which had experienced revival in the late 1960s under the leadership of David Watson and could no longer be accommodated in the building. Growth continued in the 1970s and the church became known as a centre for charismatic renewal.

Present
The church continues to reflect the creativity that was encouraged under the David Watson era. There are usually three services held on Sunday, a more formal morning service at 9 am; the "XI", a family service at 11 am; and "The6", an evening service, both with a more informal style, featuring contemporary worship. The "Faith in the City" service meets at 12:30 on Wednesday lunch-times, providing workers of the city a short half-hour service mid-week, with a light lunch served afterwards.

The church maintains links with Riding Lights Theatre Company, York Schools and Youth Trust (YoYo), Alpha UK as well as numerous parachurch organisations involved in mission work both locally and internationally. The church is a member of the One Voice York, Evangelical Alliance and New Wine network of churches.

Its daughter church, G2,  meets twice on a Sunday at Central Methodist Church York.

The Belfrey (as it is sometimes known) is a larger Anglican church and the present incumbent is the Reverend Matthew Porter. The other senior clergy are Reverend Andy Baker (Associate Minister) and Reverend Vicky Earll (Curate).

See also

References
Notes

Bibliography

External links
 
 
 St Michael le Belfrey Chinese Ministry
 G2

Minster Yard
1536 establishments in England
16th-century Church of England church buildings
Churches completed in 1536
Michael
Michael
Religious buildings and structures completed in 1536